Brendan may refer to:

People
 Saint Brendan the Navigator (c. 484 – c. 577) was an Irish monastic saint.
 Saint Brendan of Birr (died 573), Abbot of Birr in Co. Offaly, contemporaneous with the above
 Brendan (given name), a masculine given name in the English language

Other uses 
 Brendan and the Secret of Kells, an animated feature film
 Brendan Airways, parent company of USA3000 Airlines
 Storm Brendan (disambiguation), various storms

See also
St. Brendan's (disambiguation)